Robert Gambrell Jones, known as Bob Jones  (born May 9, 1939), is a former Louisiana politician who served in the Louisiana House of Representatives from 1968 to 1972 and in the State Senate from 1972 to 1976. Entering politics as a Democrat, Jones became a Republican in 1978.

References

External links
  
 
  
 Louisiana House of Representatives, 1880-2008 (Baton Rouge: Secretary of State)
 Louisiana State Senators, 1880-2004 (Baton Rouge: Secretary of State)

1939 births
Living people
Members of the Louisiana House of Representatives
Louisiana state senators
Politicians from Lake Charles, Louisiana
Louisiana Democrats
Louisiana Republicans
Businesspeople from Louisiana
Harvard Business School alumni
Tulane University alumni
Stockbrokers
American United Methodists